Rye whiskey generally refers to whiskies distilled from rye.

In music it may refer to:
 "Way Up on Clinch Mountain", a traditional Scottish folk song, recorded as
 "Rye Whiskey" by country and western singer Tex Ritter in the 1930s
 "Rye Whiskey" by folk singer Woody Guthrie
 "Rye Whiskey" by Norwegian musician Susanna Wallumrød
 "Jack of Diamonds", another traditional song sometimes known as "Rye Whiskey"
 "Whiskey and Rye" as in the song American Pie by Don McLean
 "Rye Whiskey", a song by the Punch Brothers